George Carter (25 March 1910 – 12 February 1971) was  a former Australian rules footballer who played with Collingwood and Hawthorn in the Victorian Football League (VFL).

Notes

External links 

George Carter's profile at Collingwood Forever

1910 births
1971 deaths
Australian rules footballers from Victoria (Australia)
Collingwood Football Club players
Hawthorn Football Club players